Tolgus may refer to the following places in Cornwall, England:

Tolgus Mount
West Tolgus